On 21 March 2021, 12 ethnic Oromo militants were killed while in an ambulance riding through the town of Shewa Robit. Fano militia has been suspected as a perpetrator of an attack.

Background
In the days leading up to the attack clashes between Amhara and Oromo militias in and around the towns of Ataye and Kamisee left hundreds dead and thousands displaced.

Attack
After fighting in the region around Ataye, a dozen of civilians that had been injured in the clashes were on their way to be taken to the much larger hospital, Yifat Hospital in Shewa Robit. The ambulance was stopped and 12 civilians were pulled from the ambulance and then beaten and stabbed to death. HRLHA's source identified suspects linked with Fano militia.

Victims
List of victims that have been identified.

Umarsha Umar Yusuf	(45)
Ahmed Aliyi Hassan (60)
Hassan Ahmed Jilo (62)
Sheh Umer Haji Hassan (40)
Hassan Mohamed Haji (25)
Mohamed Aliyi Umar (40)
Abdushe Umar Baza (55)
Adam Abdushe Umar (25)
Mohamed Aliyi Hassen (30)
Ismael Mohammed (35)

References 

2021 crimes in Ethiopia
Massacres in 2021
Massacres in Ethiopia
Mass murder in 2021
Ethiopian civil conflict (2018–present)